Norwood Tunnel was a ,  and  brick (3 million of them) lined canal tunnel on the line of the Chesterfield Canal with its Western Portal in Norwood, Derbyshire and its Eastern Portal in Kiveton, South Yorkshire, England.

Origins
The Chesterfield Canal's Act of Parliament was passed on 28 March 1771. James Brindley was appointed as the chief engineer, and having raised the capital in just four months, the proprietors instructed him to start work on 11 July 1771. John Varley was the Clerk of the Works, and undertook the day-to-day management of the project. With plenty of optimism, they decided that work should start at Norwood Hill on the construction of the Norwood Tunnel. The work was difficult, and there were numerous accidents, with some men losing their lives, although the company appears to have been benevolent towards the families of those bereaved by the work.

Brindley told the committee on 26 June 1772 that he expected the tunnel to be completed in two years, and the whole canal in four. He did not live to see either event, as he died on 24 September. John Varley was left to continue alone as acting chief engineer after the death of Brindley. In 1774, Hugh Henshall, Brindley's brother-in-law was made chief engineer, with John Varley keeping the position of resident engineer. Apart from a short section in the middle, the tunnel was lined with bricks, and so the company established a brickworks at Harthill, and advertised for brickmakers. Three million bricks would be required, and the company would supply the materials and the coal needed to fire them. This should have been easy to do, as the area around Norwood Hill had plentiful coal deposits, but a clause in the Act of Parliament stated that all minerals found during the construction of the canal remained the property of the person from whom the land had been bought, and so the canal company had to negotiate with the Duke of Leeds to buy supplies of coal, in some cases from their own land.

An intriguing aspect of the project occurred in May 1774, when the minute book records that five shillings was paid to a Mr Samuel Watt on 22 May, for making a model of a machine to draw boats through the tunnel and demonstrating it to the Committee. It is not known whether Watt was related to James Watt, who had developed an improved steam engine in the 1760s, and it was clearly too early for the machine to have been a self-propelled tug. There have been suggestions that it involved a moving chain or rope, powered by a steam engine, but nothing further was heard of the idea, as no action was taken. The Norwood Tunnel was formally opened on 9 May 1775, with the Derby Mercury newspaper carrying a report of the celebrations. Some 300 people, including Henshall and some of the principal workmen, were transported through the tunnel on three boats. They were accompanied by a musical band, and the journey took one hour and one minute. At the time it held the record for Britain's longest canal tunnel jointly with James Brindley's Harecastle Tunnel.

At the end of July 1775 an auction of equipment, which had been used to construct the tunnel, was held at the eastern portal:1 Horse Gin complete, Wheel 14 feet diam, pulleys 3 feet 6 inches  -  1 Horse Gin complete, Wheel 11 feet diam, pulleys 3 feet 6 inches  -  1 Horse Gin complete, Wheel 10 feet diam, pulleys 2 feet 8 inches  -  1 Water Engine Wheel, 20 feet diameter  -  1 Water Engine Wheel, 17 feet diameter  -  1 Water Engine Wheel, 16 feet diameter  -  9 Turn Barrels and Stand Trees  -  20 Yards of Pump Trees, 8 inch bore  -  4, 6 inch Cast Metal Working Pieces  -  1 Wind Engine  -  2 Pair of Smiths Bellows  -  4 Horse Water Tubs  -  A number of Rollers fixed in Frames for Slide Rods, Drum Wheels and Chains, and Slide and Pump Rod Joints.

The tunnel did not have a towpath, and narrowboats were therefore pushed through the tunnel by their crews. This process of the crew pushing against the walls or roof of a canal tunnel with their legs in order to propel the narrowboat through the tunnel is called Legging.

Length
There is some discrepancy as to the actual length of the tunnel. Both Hadfield and Roffey use this length, with Roffey claiming that it was the second longest tunnel when built. Hadfield acknowledges that it may have been extended when Thomas Telford's second Harecastle Tunnel was constructed.

The Manchester, Sheffield and Lincolnshire Railway (MSLR) purchased the Chesterfield Canal in 1847. It has been claimed that the tunnel may have been lengthened or shortened when the Sheffield to Gainsborough railway was built nearby, but a map of its predecessor, the proposed Manchester & Lincoln Union Railway of 1845, shows the portals in their current locations. Examples include Cumberlidge, although Nicholson quotes . Richardson quotes , the same as Rees's length for the Harecastle Tunnel.

He confirms that there is no evidence for the tunnel being lengthened or shortened, explaining that the quoted length has been derived by using the Ordnance Survey grid references for the tunnel portals, and using Pythagorus's theorem to calculate the length.

Decline
A large colliery was developed above the tunnel, operated by the Kiveton Park Colliery Company. The removal of coal from seams under the tunnel caused major subsidence problems - segments began to sink. As the water level was constant the roof became nearer to the water surface. In 1871 the MSLR started what would be twenty years of roof-raising to keep Norwood Tunnel passable. The raising of practically the whole length of the tunnel roof was done by prolonging the side walls and rebuilding the semi-circular arch. It is this work that obfuscates the originality or otherwise of the construction shafts.

After days of heavy rain a  section of the tunnel collapsed on 18 October 1907, leaving a large hole in a field near the road to Harthill.  With only minimal boat-traffic on the declining canal the cost of repairing the fall could not be justified and the tunnel has remained blocked ever since, splitting the Chesterfield Canal into two sections.

The tunnel today

The Chesterfield Canal has been restored as far as the Eastern Portal of the Norwood Tunnel largely through the efforts of Chesterfield Canal Trust. Part of the canal West of the tunnel from Chesterfield to Staveley has also been restored. Further restoration is proceeding.
Current plans for the tunnel include the opening up of the tunnel in the Kiveton Park area, creating a cutting followed by the restoration of the remaining tunnel to Norwood.

See also

List of canal tunnels in Great Britain
Chesterfield Canal

References

Notes

Bibliography

External links

 
 
 
 
 

Canal tunnels in England
Tunnels completed in 1775
Tunnels in Derbyshire
Tunnels in South Yorkshire